The Troy Historic Village is located in the city of Troy, Michigan. The establishment allows visitors to view the lifestyle of those who lived in Troy Township in the 1800s. The carefully restored buildings include the main building (City Hall), log cabin, a Greek Revival Home, a brick one-room school, print shop, wagon shop, a town hall, a general store, and a turn of the century church and parsonage.

Buildings

Main Building (City Hall)
The main building that was once upon a time called Troy Township but later on renamed city hall was designed by an architect named J. Bissell and was made in the year 1927. The building was remade under the leadership of the township supervisor Morris Wattles who decided that the building should be modeled after a Dutch colonial tavern in the city of Troy, New York. After the completion of the City Hall the museum opened inside of the building in 1966.

Print Shop
J. Henry Russell owned this shop. He did woodturning, tinsmithing and also photography. The print store was used to make posters, calling cards and public announcements. Troy Township's old water meter was renovated in the year of 1978 so it could serve as a printshop for the village

Caswell House (Greek Revival Home)
The pioneer Soloman Caswell built the home in 1832. The house's symmetrical windows and cornice with dentils are reasons why the house was known as a Greek revival home. The house contained stovepipes that provided heat for all the rooms in the house. The house was very similar to any other house that would have existed in the 1800s. The house contained a dry sink for washing dishes and even food was kept in tin-punched panels that was used to keep flies off of food.

Old Troy Church
This church was built in 1837 at troy corners. The deed to the land of the church was sold for $1.00 by the pioneer Johnson Niles. New stained glass windows were installed in the church around 1900. Still many of the windows of the church were never removed. The church was changed to the Methodist Episcopal community in 1862. The church served as the village's house of worship until 1963. The original bell in the church is still there to this day.

Log Cabin
The Log Cabin is a one-room home that serves as a depiction of the life of a pioneer in the 1840s. The cabin has a fireplace that was once used for heat and to provide good meals. The mother of the house did handwork while rocking the baby in a cradle. The parents slept in a bed made of rope, the children instead got to sleep in the loft on straw mattresses covered with quilts.

Wagon Shop
The Wagon Shop's Blacksmith provided residents of the village with iron farm tools, household utensils and wagon parts as well. the Blacksmith would as work with the wood workers in the village to create objects such as wagons and other things too.

General Store 
The town's general store was built by Edward Peck in 1832. The store was demolished in 1963 but was reconstructed as a representation the store in the village a while later. Inside the store you are able to see examples of items that used to be sold ch as the cast iron stove.

Parsonage 
The Parsonage was a cruciform shaped house built in 1978 by the congregation of the Troy Methodist Church. It served as a parsonage for over 25 ministers and their families. The building has been restored to its 1910 image when indoor plumbing and electricity became available.

Troy Town Hall
The Troy Town Hall was originally built as the Troy Union School in 1864. The school was moved to the Village in 1987 to represent Troy's first town hall, today it serves as a hands-on teaching area.

Poppleton School
Poppleton was built in 1877. The school was named after a man by the name of William Poppleton, a man who owned 1,200 acres of land in Troy. Children ranging from the ages 8-14 attended this school. The school was taught by only one teacher who taught all the subjects such as reading, arithmetic, spelling, penmanship and more. Boys had to sit on one side while the girls sat on another side. Poppleton school was relocated to the Village in the year 1980

References

Buildings and structures in Troy, Michigan
Museums in Oakland County, Michigan
Open-air museums in Michigan